General Mimoun Mansouri ( – born 1946 in Tiztoutin, Nador Province) is a Moroccan general. He has been the commander of the Royal Guard since the 1970s. He is also the president of the Moroccan Polo Federation.

In August 2002, Mohammed VI promoted him to the rank of Divisional general. 

His younger brothers, Benali Mansouri and Mustapha Mansouri were both ministers.

See also
Mohamed Medbouh
Mustapha Mansouri
Abdelaziz Bennani

References

Moroccan military personnel
People from Nador
Living people
Moroccan generals
1946 births